The Nakuru Agreement, signed on June 21, 1975, in Nakuru, Kenya, was an attempt to salvage the Alvor Agreement, which granted Angola independence from Portugal and established a transitional government. While the Nakuru Agreement did produce a truce between the three nationalist movements—the Popular Movement for the Liberation of Angola (MPLA), National Liberation Front of Angola (FNLA), and National Union for the Total Independence of Angola (UNITA)—it was a fragile truce that dissolved on July 9, 1975.

Negotiation
The three principal separatist leaders, MPLA's Agostinho Neto, UNITA's Jonas Savimbi, and the FNLA's Holden Roberto met in Nakuru from June 15–21. Kenyan President Jomo Kenyatta moderated the negotiations. The leaders "denounce[d] the use of force as a means of solving problems" and again agreed to put down their arms and disarm civilians.

References

External links
Text of all peace accords for Angola

Peace treaties of Angola
1975 in Angola
Treaties concluded in 1975
Angolan Civil War
Angolan War of Independence
Cold War treaties
1975 in Kenya